Marcus Paul Blucas (born January 11, 1972) is an American actor. Prior to his acting career, he played college basketball with the Wake Forest Demon Deacons. He had his first starring role as soldier and love interest Riley Finn on the WB supernatural drama series Buffy the Vampire Slayer from 1999 to 2000, and later starred as football team manager Matthew Donnelly on the USA drama series Necessary Roughness from 2011 to 2013. 

Blucas starred alongside Katie Holmes in the romantic comedy film First Daughter (2004) and also had lead roles in the thriller films Three (2006) and The Killing Floor (2007). He had supporting roles in the romance films I Capture the Castle (2003), After Sex (2007), and The Jane Austen Book Club (2007); the horror films They (2002), Deadline (2009), and Unearth (2020); the thriller films Brawl in Cell Block 99 (2017) and Looking Glass (2018); and the drama films Prey for Rock & Roll (2004) and Touchback (2011).

Early life
Marcus Paul Blucas was born on January 11, 1972, in Butler, Pennsylvania, two years after his sister, Kristen. His parents, Walter Joseph Blucas and Mary Catherine (née Gordon), married on January 10, 1970, shortly before both graduated from Indiana University of Pennsylvania (IUP). They are divorced. 

A self-confessed square who earned good grades," Blucas was, like his father, a skilled sportsman.  Wally was the quarterback on the undefeated 1968 Big Indians team, competed in the Boardwalk Bowl, and in 1999 was inducted into the IUP Athletics Hall of Fame. 

The family moved to Girard in Erie, Pennsylvania, in 1974, where Blucas' father rose from teacher to school principal and ultimately to Superintendent of Schools for the District. Blucas became the star player on the Girard High School basketball team, leading them to the Pennsylvania Boys AA State Championship, in the process earning all-state honors and a sports scholarship to Wake Forest University. He played on the Wake Forest Demon Deacons men's basketball team and graduated in 1994 after one season playing on the same court as Tim Duncan. He was also a member of the Sigma Phi Epsilon fraternity.

After Blucas failed to make it into the NBA, he moved to England, where he played professional basketball for a year with British Basketball League's Manchester Giants (1975–2001). He later decided to become a lawyer, but changed his mind and went into acting instead.

Career
Blucas's first television role was in the television movie Inflammable, made in 1995. From there, he found roles in both television and film. He starred as the Basketball Hero in Gary Ross's Pleasantville (1998). However, Blucas landed his first major role in 1999 as Agent Riley Finn in Buffy the Vampire Slayer. Initially, Blucas was certain that he had blown his audition and had left apologizing for having wasted creator Joss Whedon's time. Whedon asked him to audition again, and he received the part two weeks later. He played Buffy's love interest until 2000.

After Blucas' departure from the series, he went on to act in such films as Summer Catch (2001), We Were Soldiers (2002), alongside Mel Gibson and Chris Klein, and First Daughter (2004), with Katie Holmes. His character in Summer Catch was based on real life Cape League baseball player Michael Macone.

In 2007, Blucas began to land leading roles in films such as Thr3e and The Killing Floor.

In February 2010, Blucas joined the cast of the ABC television drama pilot True Blue.

Blucas was part of the regular cast of the USA Network show Necessary Roughness for the first two seasons, playing Matthew Donnelly. The series premiered on June 29, 2011.

Personal life
On July 25, 2009, Blucas married journalist Ryan Haddon, daughter of Dayle Haddon; they have two daughters, and Blucas is also stepfather to her two children from her first marriage to actor Christian Slater.

Filmography

Film

Television

References

External links

1972 births
20th-century American male actors
21st-century American male actors
Actors from Erie, Pennsylvania
American male film actors
American male television actors
Basketball players from Pennsylvania
Living people
Male actors from Pittsburgh
Wake Forest Demon Deacons men's basketball players
Wake Forest University alumni
American men's basketball players